Mecocerculus is a genus of birds in the large tyrant flycatcher family Tyrannidae.

It contains the following 6 species:

References

 
Bird genera
 
Taxa named by Philip Sclater
Taxonomy articles created by Polbot